Đỗ Mỹ Linh (born 19 August 1975), who uses the stage name Mỹ Linh, is a Vietnamese singer, songwriter, television personality, and vocal coach. Referred to as the "Queen of Vietnamese R&B" and the "Queen of Spring", she is one of the best-selling Vietnamese music artists of all time. My Linh is noted for her powerful and technically skilled vocals.

Early life and education 
My Linh was born in a working-class family in Hanoi on 19 August 1975. Her father was a literature school-teacher, then worker and building constructor. Her mother was a worker in a pharmaceutical factory. She has an older brother and a younger sister.

My Linh exhibited musical and performing talents at a very young age, gathering awards at various local children music contests. She attended Elementary and Middle School in Hai Bà Trưng District, Hanoi. In 1994, she graduated from Bạch Mai High School and came first in the entrance exam to the Hanoi Conservatory of Music. She graduated in 1997, having become a famous pop singer.

Music career 
In August 1993, My Linh and the Hoa Sữa band won second place at the National Pop Music Festival. Mỹ Linh herself won the Best New Artist award with the song Thì Thầm Mùa Xuân written by Ngọc Châu. My Linh started her professional music career after the Festival and became one of the best-loved Vietnamese singers.

In 1998, My Linh married composer and producer Anh Quân. This was an important step in her music career. She began to perform Soul and Funk music. She went on a Vietnam tour Tiếng Hát Mỹ Linh in 1998, performing in Hanoi, Da Nang and Ho Chi Minh City. Following the success of the tour, in 1999, she released Tóc Ngắn album, which has become her trademark.

In 2003, My Linh signed a contract with the American record company, Blue Tiger, to release an English-language album, attracting wide media attention in Vietnam. Coming to America was released in 2004.

In 2006, My Linh was one of the judges for Sao Mai Điểm Hẹn, a singing contest hosted by Vietnam Television to discover young music talents.

My Linh has performed in many countries, including China, Thailand, Korea, Russia, Germany, Czech Republic, Ukraine, Switzerland, United Kingdom, Cuba, United States, Canada and Australia. In 2006, she is the only Vietnamese artist performing in Asian Divas night in Nagoya, Japan.

Personal life 
My Linh married composer and producer Anh Quân in 1998. They have two children, Anh Duy and Mỹ Anh. Anna (Vietnamese name Mỹ Hà) is Anh Quân's daughter from his first marriage.
Her favourite singers are Thanh Lam, Whitney Houston, Mariah Carey, Brian McKnight and Babyface.

Activism 
In 2004, My Linh recorded a public service announcement about the threats that people's consumption of bear bile posed to wild bear populations and to the welfare of bears that are farmed for their bile. The short film, which was broadcast on several Vietnamese TV stations, and included footage shot at bear farms in Hanoi. The film was produced by Education for Nature Vietnam, the country's first non-governmental organization to focus on conservation, with assistance from the London-based Environmental Justice Foundation.

Discography

Studio albums 
 10 Tình Khúc Bảo Phúc – Anh Thoa (1995)
 Vẫn Hát Lời Tình Yêu (1996)
 Xin Mặt Trời Ngủ Yên (1996)
 Cho Một Người Tình Xa (1996)
 Mỹ Linh (1997)
 Mùa Thu Không Trở Lại (1998)
 Chiều Xuân (1998)
 Còn Mãi Tìm Nhau (1999)
 Tóc Ngắn (1998)
 Tóc Ngắn Vol. 2: Vẫn Mãi Mong Chờ (2000)
 Made in Vietnam (2003)
 Chat Với Mozart (2005)
 Để Tình Yêu Hát (2006)
 Tóc Ngắn Acoustic: Một Ngày (2011)
 Chat Với Mozart Vol. II (2018)

Video albums 
Mỹ Linh (1998)
Tóc Ngắn (2000)
Mỹ Linh Tour '06 (2007)
Cảm Xúc Mùa Thu (2012)

References

External links 
 Mỹ Linh's official website
 Mỹ Linh's official fan page
 "Singer My Linh to be tourism ambassador for RoK", Vietnam+, 27 July 2011.

1975 births
Living people
People from Hanoi
Vietnamese women singers